This is a list of notable black photographers.

A
Edmund Abaka
Felicia Abban
Fati Abubakar
Harry Adams
Dayo Adedayo
Brenda Agard
Ajamu X
Jenevieve Aken
Lola Akinmade Åkerström
Jim Alexander
Salimah Ali
Khalik Allah
Devin Allen
James Latimer Allen
Jules T. Allen
Winifred Hall Allen
Solomon Osagie Alonge
Kelechi Amadi-Obi
Esther Anderson
Bert Andrews
Philip Kwame Apagya
Thomas E. Askew
Aisha Augie-Kuta

B
James Presley Ball
Alvin Baltrop
Ray Barbee
Anthony Barboza
James Barnor
C. M. Battey
Norman Baynard
Arthur P. Bedou
Thony Belizaire
TY Bello
Dawoud Bey
Nydia Blas
Kwame Brathwaite
Sheila Pree Bright
Dudley M. Brooks
Syd Burke
Vanley Burke

C
Dario Calmese
Don Hogan Charles
Roland Charles
Barron Claiborne
Andrea Clark
Carl Clark
Linda Day Clark
Florestine Perrault Collins
Renee Cox
Guy Crowder

D
George Da Costa
Roy DeCarava
Andrew Dosunmu
Barbara DuMetz

E
Victor Ehikhamenor
Edward Elcha
Yagazie Emezi
Isaac Emokpae
Andrew Esiebo

F
Rotimi Fani-Kayode
James C. Farley
Sharon Farmer
Tam Fiofori
Lola Flash
Rahim Fortune (born 1994)
LaToya Ruby Frazier
Armet Francis
Roland Freeman
Diallo Javonne French
Howard W. French

G
Rahima Gambo
Bill Gaskins
Wilda Gerideau-Squires
Robert A. Gilbert
Leo Antony Gleaton
Lonnie Graham
J. A. Green
Stanley Greene

H
Austin Hansen
Elise Forrest Harleston
Charles Harris
Harry Adams
Paul Henderson
R.C. Hickman
Chester Higgins Jr.
Robert Houston
Letitia Huckaby

I
Janna Ireland
Novo Isioro

J
Vera Jackson
Atiba Jefferson
David Johnson
Lou Jones

K
Kamoinge
Roshini Kempadoo
Seydou Keïta
Neil Kenlock
Hakeem Khaaliq
Charles Kinkead

L
Wayne Lawrence
Deana Lawson
David Lee
Quil Lemons
Jules Lion

M
Louise Martin
John Clark Mayden
Bruce McNeil
Robert H. McNeill
Tyler Mitchell
John W. Mosley
Jeanne Moutoussamy-Ashe
Aïda Muluneh

N
Amarachi Nwosu

O
J. D. 'Okhai Ojeikere
Emeka Okereke
Lukman Olaonipekun
Bayo Omoboriowo
Ifeoma Onyefulu
Horace Ové
Zak Ové
Mikael Owunna

P
Gordon Parks
Charlie Phillips
Irving Henry Webster Phillips Sr.
Bob Pixel (Emmanuel Yeboah Bobbie)
Michael B. Platt
P. H. Polk

Q
Terri Quaye

R
Eli Reed
Isaiah Rice
Bayeté Ross Smith
Radcliffe Roye

S
Addison N. Scurlock
Mark Sealy
Taiye Selasi
Robert A. Sengstacke
Andres Serrano
Jamel Shabazz
John Shearer
Yinka Shonibare
Coreen Simpson
Lorna Simpson
Moneta Sleet Jr.
Clarissa Sligh
Ming Smith
Morgan and Marvin Smith
Frank Stewart
Chanell Stone
Maud Sulter

T
Bruce Talamon
Ron Tarver
Hank Willis Thomas

U
Uche James-Iroha
Iké Udé
August Udoh
David Uzochukwu

V
James Van Der Zee
Raven B. Varona

W
Augustus Washington
Lewis Watts
Carrie Mae Weems
John H. White
Pat Ward Williams
Pep Williams
Deborah Willis (artist)
Ernest Withers
LeRoy Woodson

Lists of black people
Lists of photographers